Vintar, officially the Municipality of Vintar, is a 1st class municipality in the province of Ilocos Norte, Philippines. According to the 2020 census, it has a population of 33,339 people.

Vintar is the largest municipality in Ilocos Norte. Its patron saint is Saint Nicholas de Tolentino. It is home to one of the biggest convents in the province where it houses the Saint Nicholas Academy. It is also where Vintar Dam is located, first dam funded by the World Bank in Southeast Asia- an important cultural property listed by the National Commission for Culture and the Arts (NCCA)  and is also the site of the Umok ni Siwawer Eco-Tourism Nature Park, the town's popular picnic resort.

Etymology
Vintar derived its name from the Ilocano word, "intar", which used to describe the formation or order taken by the subject from their ruler whenever the chief called them to attention. It is said that a visiting Spanish missionary heard the word and added the letter V, referring to the “V” formation that the missionary saw.

History
The town's earliest settlers are believed to be of Malay in origin. They first settled on a hill overlooking the Bislak. The town was founded by the Spanish missionaries who got lost in the woods while hunting between Sarrat and Piddig. Vintar became a visita of Bacarra but it was later established as a Parish of San Nicolas de Tolentino. Earlier in 1763, Vintar was reverted to a visita until it became independent in 1774.

In 1903, Vintar was annexed as a barrio of Bacarra. It gained its separation and independence in 1909.

The town is home to one of the biggest convents in the Province of Ilocos Norte.  In 1931, an earthquake partially destroyed its church and convent. Five years later, it was restored. The convent which houses the Saint Nicolas Academy was restored in 1982.

Vintar was one of the Ilocos region municipalities where various human rights violations were documented during the martial law era, despite public perception that the region was supportive of the Marcos administration. Three indigenous community members in Vintar are documented to have been "salvaged" in 1984, the same year as eight farmers in Bangui also disappeared, while farmers from the towns of Vintar, Dumalneg, Solsona, Marcos and Piddig were also documented to have been tortured.

Vintar celebrates the feast of St. Nicholas every 10 September- a religious tradition inherited from the Augustinians lives that still practice the distribution of “tinapay ni San Nicolas” (unleavened bread). But the Siwawer Festival, the annual town fiesta of Vintar is held from December 26–30 of every year.

The people of Vintar engage in farming, fishing and herding. The town is generally rural but famous all over the province for its beautiful women with strongly Spanish features. Hence the town has its monicker, “The Home of Beautiful People”.
Vintar is also the site of four (4) important cultural properties listed by the National Commission for Culture and the Arts. These are Vintar Dam, the Old Municipal Building, San Nicolas de Tolentino Parish Church and the Gabaldon Building.

The Municipality of Vintar is headed by the Local Chief Executive, Mayor Larisa Cadavona Foronda from 2016 up to present.

Geography 
Vintar is located on a plain land surrounded by mountains. Vintar is surrounded and bordered by:
 Bangui, Adams, Dumalneg, Burgos and Pagudpud in the north;
 Laoag, Sarrat, Piddig, and Carasi in the south;
 Pasuquin and Bacarra in the west;
 Calanasan, Apayao in the east.

The town is considered as the sixth major river system in the region. Its head waters are on the western Cordillera slopes at the Kalinga and Apayao borders. It flows eastward and irrigates most of the flat lands of Ilocos Norte before making its exit into the China Sea. Vintar has the largest land area in Ilocos Norte.

Climate 

Vintar is divided into two types of climate:
 90% or the Western Part: Two pronounced seasons, dry from December to May and wet from June to November. Maximum rain period is from June to September.
 10% or the Eastern Part: No very pronounced maximum rain period, with a short dry season lasting only from one to three months.

Barangays

Vintar is politically subdivided into 33 barangays.

Sub-divisions

Poblacion

Poblacion is the center-most subdivision of Vintar. Poblacion is composed of 5 barangays namely:

 1- San Roque
 2- San Nicolas
 3- San Pedro
 4- Santa Maria
 5- San Ramon

Metro Poblacion

Metro Poblacion is composed of 5 barangays namely:

 6- Parut
 7- Alejo Malasig
 8- Margaay
 9- Lubnac
 10- Parparoroc

Pallas Valley

It is located at the north-east of Vintar. Pallas Valley is composed of 4 barangays namely:

 11- Bulbulala
 12- Namoroc
 13- Mabanbanag
 14- Ester

North of the River (Amian ti Karayan)

North of the River or "Amian ti Karayan" is located north of the Bislak River from Poblacion. It is called so after the Ilocano word "Amian" which means north. Amian ti Karayan is composed of 8 barangays namely:

 16- Salsalamagui 
 17- P.F. Alviar
 18- Abkir
 19- Columbia
 20- Cabisuculan
 21- Malampa
 22- Manarang
 24- Alsem

Lower Surong Valley

 15- Visaya
 23- Dipilat
 25- Tamdagan
 26- Canaam
 27- Esperanza
 28- Bago
 29/30- San Jose/Sto.Tomas

Upper Surong Valley

Upper Surong Valley is composed of 4 barangays namely:

 31- Dagupan
 32- Cabangaran
 33- Cabayo
 34- Isic Isic

Mount Baguinsuso

Mount Baguinsuso, also known as Mount Masadsada (Ilocano which means "passable valley"), is among the most recognized landmarks located in Barangay 15- Visaya.

Demographics

Economy

Transportation

Vintar can be reached through air via Laoag International Airport at Laoag City, then hiring a tricycle or any other public transportation. From Manila by bus, it will take about 10 to 12 hours in reaching the center of Vintar. Farinas and Maria De Leon are the major companies that have a daily trip to Vintar.

Festival

Siwawer Festival is the annual festival of Vintar. This festival of the town is being celebrated in honor of the siwawer the local name of the brahminy kite species of eagle that soars the skies of Vintar. The Festival starts on December 4 which is also the Vintar Day, the foundation of the municipality when it was separated from the town of Bacarra in 1909.

Government 
Vintar, belonging to the first congressional district of the province of Ilocos Norte, is governed by a mayor designated as its local chief executive and by a municipal council as its legislative body in accordance with the Local Government Code. The mayor, vice mayor, and the councilors are elected directly by the people through an election which is being held every three years.

Elected officials

Municipal seal
 The shield is derived from the provincial seal of Ilocos Norte.
 The letter V stands for the word Vintar, the name of the municipality.
 The eagle represents the native hawk, commonly called Siwawer by the old folks and after which the people of Vintar are referred to.
 Landscape, plow, rice stalk, onion, garlic, mango, eggplant and tobacco leaf, at the left side of the shield representing the municipality's principal farming industries.
 Dam, gate valve, water and fish at the right side of the shield represent Vintar-Laoag-Bacarra irrigation system. The dam also stands for the Siwawers, a resort the town is famous for; the fish symbolizes one of the main income-generating products of the locality.

References

External links

 [ Philippine Standard Geographic Code]
Philippine Census Information
Local Governance Performance Management System

Municipalities of Ilocos Norte